Amy Honey is a Canadian singer-songwriter from West Chezzetcook, Nova Scotia.

Background and career 

Over the years, Honey has formed a number of bands, including the ladyrock extravaganza known as Clover Honey, which toured Canada several times and won CITR radio's prestigious "Shindig Battle of the Bands" in 1999. Honey formed her own band in 2002 and recorded her self-titled debut CD with Scott Henderson at S.O.S. Studios.

Honey toured Canada in support of her debut album, sharing the stage with Howe Gelb and Mr. Airplane Man. She has also played shows with such diverse performers as Carolyn Mark, Jenny Whiteley, Chris Brown, Andrew Vincent, The Willowz, Po' Girl, Chet, The Doers, Ida Nilsen, Blood Meridian, Veda Hille, Hank Pine & Lily Fawn, 20 Miles and BJ Snowden.
   
In 2003, Honey and her husband opened Red Cat Records, an independent record store in Vancouver, BC, specializing in local and rare CDs and dedicated to promoting the releases and shows of local bands.

Honey released her second solo album, Pioneer Woman, in 2007. The album was recorded at Tolan McNeil's Lucky Mouse Studios and also features Tolan McNeil, Gregory "Goose" MacDonald, Carolyn Mark, Diona Davies, Ida Nilsen, Grayson Walker and Calvin Dick.

Discography 

 Clover Honey, Go Horse Go CD (Lance Rock Records) 2000
Dirty Honey
Caroline
Long Gone
It' All Good
Late August
Omar
Alleyway
Summer Song
The Beast
Really Dirty Honey

 Amy's Rocks, Plans CD + Zine (self released) 2001

 Amy Honey, S/T CD (Red Cat Records) 2003
Dirtbikin'
Do Ya Wanna Play Darts?
Porchlights
Mishka Lishka
Rochon Sands
Time Machine
Make Me A Woman Tonight
Lousy Mom
Shady Pines Campground
Sabbath!
About the Exes
Welcomf Home
Ride

 Amy Honey, Pioneer Woman CD (Self Righteous Records) 2007
Woods Hag
Farley Mowat
Pioneer Woman
Do or Be Damned
Red Wine
Lily My Deer
Larry The Homicidal Maniac
Hopeless
Maybelline & Billy
Sweet Ol' West Chezzetcook
Touch 'Em With Love
Old Reliable Death

Contributions

 Carolyn Mark, Just Married: An Album of Duets (Mint Records) 2005 – "Rocket Piano Man"

External links
Amy Honey’s official site
Amy Honey on MySpace
Self Righteous Records
Amy Honey’s page at Red Cat Records
Clover Honey (Archived 2009-10-25)

Living people
Canadian women singer-songwriters
Canadian women guitarists
Canadian rock guitarists
Musicians from Halifax, Nova Scotia
Year of birth missing (living people)